Suleiman Ali Nashnush (1943 – February 25, 1991) was a Libyan basketball player and actor and one of the 20 individuals in medical history to reach or surpass  in height.  

He was the tallest basketball player ever at  although he was only  when he played professional basketball.

Nashnush also had a small role in Federico Fellini's film Fellini Satyricon where he played the role of Tryphaena's attendant. He died on February 25, 1991.

See also 
 List of tallest people

References

External links 
 Eurobasket's TOP 50 TALLEST PLAYERS IN THE WORLD
 

1943 births
1991 deaths
People from Tripoli, Libya
People with gigantism
Libyan men's basketball players